Panjakent District or Nohiya-i Panjakent is a former district in Sughd Region, Tajikistan. Its capital was Panjakent. Around 2018, it was merged into the city of Panjakent.

Administrative divisions
The district was divided administratively into jamoats. They were as follows (and population).

Notes

References

Former districts of Tajikistan
Sughd Region